Governor Reed may refer to:

Clyde M. Reed (1871–1949), 24th Governor of Kansas
Harrison Reed (politician) (1813–1899), 9th Governor of Florida
John H. Reed (1921–2012), 67th Governor of Maine
Joseph Reed (politician) (1741–1785), 3rd President of Pennsylvania
William Reed (British colonial official) (c. 1670–1728), Acting Governor of North-Carolina from 1722 to 1724

See also
Governor Reid (disambiguation)